H̨awţah Sudayr or Hautat Sudair is a city in Saudi Arabia. It's located at the intersection 12-13 Riyadh-Sudair-Qassim. 140 km north of the capital Riyadh.

See also 

 List of cities and towns in Saudi Arabia
 Regions of Saudi Arabia

References

External links

Populated places in Riyadh Province